Henline Falls is a waterfall in the Opal Creek Wilderness in Oregon, USA.

Henline Creek supplies the flow of water to the falls.

Henline Falls is named from nearby Henline Mountain. There was a silver mine near the waterfall, resulting in the nickname Silver King Falls.

References

Waterfalls of Oregon